Martin Eisend (born September 14, 1968, in Auerbach in der Oberpfalz, Bavaria, Germany) is a German chaired professor of marketing at the European University Viadrina in Frankfurt (Oder), Germany.

Biography 
Martin Eisend studied communication science and business administration at the Free University of Berlin and the Fernuniversität Hagen from 1994 to 2000. After completing his master's degree, he worked from 2000 to 2004 as a research assistant at Professor Alfred Kuss's chair for marketing at the Free University of Berlin. In 2003, he received his doctorate. From 2004 to 2007, he was junior professor for marketing, especially market communication, at the Free University of Berlin. In 2007, he has been offered the chair for marketing at the European University Viadrina, where he has been working since then. From 2014 to 2018, he was Study Dean of the Faculty of Business and Economics and since 2019, he has been vice president for Research, Graduate Education, and Knowledge Transfer at the European University Viadrina.

He held guest professorships and research stays at Columbia University in New York City in 2006; at Antwerp University in 2011; at the Amsterdam School of Communication Research (ASCOR) at the University of Amsterdam in 2015; at Macquarie University in Sydney and at the Vienna University of Economics and Business in 2016. Since 2017, he is heading the Center for Market Communications. He has been President of the European Advertising Academy since 2018.

Martin Eisend lives in Berlin with his husband and two children.

Research 
Martin Eisend's research focuses on consumer behavior and marketing communication. Other work explains the effect of specific marketing communication techniques, such as the use of humor, creativity, advertising repetitions, or negative information in advertising.

His work involves the application of meta-analyses and he has written some methodological and epistemological works on the application and development of this method as well as on the scientific methodology in marketing in general.

Recognition 
In the ranking of the German newspaper Wirtschaftswoche in 2020, which analyzes the research performance of more than 3000 researchers in business administration in Germany, Austria and Switzerland based on the quality of their publications, he placed 13th place for current research performance and 19th place for career performance.

Publications (selection)

Journal Publications

Books 
 Eisend, Martin & Alfred Kuß (2021), Grundlagen empirischer Forschung. Zur Methodologie der Betriebswirtschaftslehre, 2. Aufl., Wiesbaden: Springer-Gabler. ISBN 978-3-658-32889-4
 Eisend, Martin (2020), Metaanalyse, 2. Aufl., München: Rainer Hampp. ISBN 978-3-95710-267-6
 Eisend, Martin & Alfred Kuss (2019), Research Methodology in Marketing. Theory Development, Empirical Approaches and Philosophy of Science Considerations, Cham: Springer Na-ture. ISBN 978-3-030-10794-9

References 

1968 births
Living people
Academic staff of European University Viadrina
Free University of Berlin alumni
University of Hagen alumni
Marketing theorists